State Route 140 (SR 140) is a  state highway in the northwestern part of the U.S. state of Georgia. It connects the Armuchee and Peachtree Corners areas, within portions of Floyd, Bartow, Cherokee, Fulton, Gwinnett counties.

Route description

SR 140 begins at an intersection with US 27/SR 1 near Armuchee, within Floyd County. It travels east, crosses over the Oostanaula River, and meets SR 53 (New Calhoun Highway NE). It crosses into Bartow County and enters Adairsville. In town, it has an intersection with US 41/SR 3 (Joe Frank Harris Parkway) and an interchange with Interstate 75 (I-75; Larry McDonald Memorial Highway). It continues to the east and then curves to the southeast to meet US 411/SR 61, just north of Rydal. It heads east into Cherokee County and then curves to the southeast. In Waleska, the highway intersects SR 108 (Fincher Road). The roadway continues to the southeast and enters Canton. Here, it has an intersection with SR 5 Connector (Reinhardt College Parkway). Farther to the south it has a concurrency with SR 5 Business. At Interstate 575/SR 5 (Phillip M. Landrum Memorial Highway), SR 5 Business ends, SR 20 joins the freeway to the northeast, and SR 140 curves to the northeast, before heading southeast again. SR 140 enters Fulton County. In the county is SR 372 (Crabapple Road). The route enters Roswell, where it joins a concurrency of SR 9/SR 120 (Alpharetta Highway). At the Roswell Town Center, the three routes meet the eastern terminus of SR 92 (East Crossville Road). At this intersection, SR 9/SR 120 depart to the southwest, while SR 140 continues to the southeast. Less than  later is US 19/SR 400 (Hospitality Highway). To the southeast, it crosses over the Chattahoochee River on the Fulton–Gwinnett County border for a short while, before it enters Gwinnett County proper and the city of Peachtree Corners. Just to the west of Norcross, SR 140 meets SR 141 (Peachtree Industrial Boulevard). Shortly to the southeast, in town, it intersects US 23/SR 13 (Buford Highway). It continues to the southeast until it meets its eastern terminus, an interchange with I-85 (Veterans Parkway), just south of Norcross.

The section of SR 140 from Roswell to its eastern terminus is the only part of the route that is included in the National Highway System, a system of roadways important to the nation's economy, defense, and mobility.

Improvements
In February 2019, the Cherokee County Board of Commissioners approved a study to determine the need for various improvements along a section of the road. The Georgia Department of Transportation currently plans to expand the route from two to four lanes by the year 2037; the board's chairman called that timeline "completely unacceptable."

Major intersections

See also

References

External links

 
 Georgia Roads (Routes 121 - 140)

140
Roswell, Georgia
Transportation in Floyd County, Georgia
Transportation in Bartow County, Georgia
Transportation in Cherokee County, Georgia
Transportation in Fulton County, Georgia
Transportation in Gwinnett County, Georgia